Highline Entertainment is a South Korean entertainment company founded in 2017 and a subsidiary of Starship Entertainment.

History
In 2017, Starship Entertainment launched another subsidiary label House of Music, which focused on recruiting smaller, independent artists, with MoonMoon being the first signed under the label. In 2018, Starship renamed the label "Highline Entertainment".

In 2018, DJ Soda signed with Highline after "House of Music" was defunct. 

In January 2019, Highline signed Jang Seok-hoon, previously a member of the hip hop scene super rookie Balming Tiger.  

In April, Highline signed Mnet's High School Rapper 3 contestant PLUMA. 

In 2020, Starship began expanding Highline, with a focus on artists who are prominent in subculture. 

In April, they signed artist Wonho, previously a member of the boy group Monsta X, to the label, who debuted in September. 

In September, they announced that singer Yoo Seung-woo had signed to the label. This moved him from Starship's acoustic sublabel "Starship Y", which brought that label to an end, as Yoo was the only artist on the label.

In August 2021, Highline sent You Da-yeon in the survival program Girls Planet 999.

Partnerships
  Victor Entertainment
  Intertwine

Artists
List adapted from official social media account.
 Wonho
 Yoo Seung-woo
 Leon	
 DJ Vanto
 dress	
 ROVXE	
 Seungguk

Former artists
 MoonMoon (2017–2018; contract terminated due to occlusion of a formal criminal record)
 DJ Soda (2018–2021)
 Lil Reta (2020–2022)
 Jang Seok-hoon (2019–2022)		
 PLUMA (2019–2022)
 M1NU (2020–2022)

Awards

References

External links

Companies based in Seoul
Entertainment companies established in 2017
Starship Entertainment
Contemporary R&B record labels
Hip hop record labels
Music publishing companies
K-pop record labels
Publishing companies established in 2017
South Korean record labels
Talent agencies of South Korea
South Korean companies established in 2017